Anahata may refer to:

 Anahata, the fourth primary chakra according to the Hindu Yogic and Tantric traditions
 Anahata (album), an album by the band June of 44
 Anahata (artist), a psychedelic trance artist